Events in the year 1849 in Norway.

Incumbents
Monarch: Oscar I

Events

  21 March – Hamar was refounded as a city (lost its city status in 1587).
 26 July – The official inauguration of the Norwegian Royal Palace ( or formally ), which occurred during the reign of Oscar I.
Ryvarden Lighthouse was established.

Arts and literature

Births
18 February – Alexander Kielland, novelist (died 1906)
8 March – Eduard Boeckmann, Norwegian American ophthalmologist, physician and inventor. (died 1927)
9 March – Nils P. Haugen, U.S. Representative from Wisconsin (died 1931)
5 June – Vilhelm Andreas Wexelsen, bishop and politician (died 1909)
15 December – Amund B. Larsen, linguist (died 1928)

Full date unknown
Marcus Olaus Bockman, priest and theologian (died 1942)
Hans Dahl, painter (died 1937)
Johan Leonard Hagen, politician
Jon Eriksson Helland II, Hardanger fiddle maker (died 1869)
Birger Kildal, politician and Minister (died 1913)
Christian Fredrik Sissenèr, property owner and politician (died 1903)

Deaths

13 May – Gjest Baardsen, outlaw, jail-breaker, non-fiction writer, songwriter and memoirist (born 1791).
6 July – Olaf Rye, military officer (born 1791)
10 October – Wilhelm Frimann Koren Christie, a Norwegian constitutional father, known for being the constitutional assembly's writer (born 1778)
6 December – Peder Olivarius Bugge, bishop (born 1764)

See also

References